Frank I. Marcus (March 23, 1928 – December 21, 2022) was an American cardiologist and Emeritus Professor of Medicine at the University of Arizona Health Sciences Center, the author of more than 290 publications in peer-reviewed medical journals and of 90 book chapters. He was considered a world expert on arrhythmogenic right ventricular cardiomyopathy (ARVC) and was a member of the Editorial/Scientific Board of 14 Cardiovascular Journals as well as a reviewer for 26 other medical publications.

Biography
Marcus graduated from Columbia College, Columbia University, obtained a master's degree in Physiology from Tufts University, and received his M.D. from the Boston University School of Medicine, graduating cum laude in 1953. He did his internship and residency at the Peter Bent Brigham Hospital in Boston.

In September 2013, he was awarded a $1.4 million RO1 National Institutes of Health grant for a multi-center five-year study titled "Mechanisms, Genotypes and Clinical Phenotypes of Arrhythmogenic Cardiomyopathy."  The study aims to analyze diagnosis of patients and family members with right ventricular and left ventricular cardiomyopathy.

Marcus died on December 21, 2022, at the age of 94.

Awards and honors
 2011 – Outstanding Achievement Award, European Cardiac Arrhythmia Society (ECAS)
 2011 – Pioneer in Cardiac Pacing and Electrophysiology Award Heart Rhythm
 2005 – Master Clinician of the AHA Council on Clinical Cardiology
 2003 – Distinguished Alumnus Award, Boston University School of Medicine
 1987 – Laureate Award, Arizona Chapter, American College of Physicians
 1981 – Award of Excellence, Cardiology Section, University of Arizona College of Medicine
 1960–1965 – Career Development Award, National Institutes of Health, -K3-HE-25-01
 1960 – John and Mary Markle Scholar in Medical Science
 1957 – Alpha Omega Alpha, Boston University chapter, Research Fellowship, Massachusetts Heart Association

Memberships
 1969–present – Association of University Cardiologists
 1978–present – Fellow, American College of Cardiology
 1982–present – North American Society of Pacing (NASPE)
 1982–present – Member Correspondent Etranger
 1988 – Societe Francaise de Cardiologie, Member, Advisory Board International
 1995–present – Fellow, Council on Geriatric Cardiology
 1999–present – Member, Scientific Advisory Board, CARE (Cardiac Arrhythmias Research and Education Foundation, Inc)
 2005–present – the European Society of Cardiology
 2005–present – Board Member: Folia Cardiologica

Selected publications

Indik JH, Dallas WJ, Gear K, Tandri H, Bluemke DA, Marcus FI, and Moukabary, T.  Right ventricular volume analysis by angiography in right ventricular cardiomyopathy.  The International Journal of Cardiovascular Imaging, in press.

References

External links
 http://heart.arizona.edu/marcus-lecture
 http://www.eplabdigest.com/article/2459
 http://azjewishpost.com/2013/people-in-the-news-9-27-13/

1928 births
2022 deaths
Boston University School of Medicine alumni
Columbia College (New York) alumni
People from Haverstraw, New York
University of Arizona faculty